Sopimetsa Nature Reserve is a nature reserve which is located in Jõgeva County, Estonia.

The protected area was founded in 1968 on the basis of Paeala Conservation Area. In 2013 the protected area was designated to the nature reserve.

References

Nature reserves in Estonia
Geography of Jõgeva County